Abernethy Road is a  long minor arterial road linking Belmont with the Great Eastern Highway Bypass in Hazelmere, a suburb of Perth, Western Australia.

It runs along the eastern boundary of the Perth Airport area.

It serves as an alternative access road for Perth Airport (via Grogan Road), and provides the foothills suburbs with alternative access to the Perth central business district.

In 2014, an on-ramp joining with Tonkin Highway where Abernethy Road passes underneath was constructed, as part of Gateway WA.

Route description
Beginning at the Great Eastern Highway in Belmont, the road passes in a south-easterly direction through residential Belmont before the Leach Highway, which it crosses. It proceeds through the  industrial area towards Tonkin Highway, where it turns to a north-easterly direction, with the remainder of the route travelling through the industrial area of Forrestfield, High Wycombe, and Hazelmere. The road ends at the Great Eastern Highway Bypass, which provides alternative access to South Guildford (to the west) or to Bellevue and Midland.

History

In 1911, Abernethy Road was used as part of the boundary between the East Perth and Midland districts in the Western Australian Cricket Association's district scheme. Later that year, new work was completed on the road by the Belmont Road Board. In January 1913, the Wattle Grove Progress Association requested that the Darling Downs Road Board make repairs to Abernethy Road and other roads in the area. In March 1929, the residents of  petitioned the road board to improve their section of Abernethy Road, which resulted in the foreman being instructed to install a culvert and plank footpath. In 1930, the road board undertook further work on Abernethy Road, using men eligible for unemployment relief payments. These works were funded by putting off the board's employees for a two-week period.

A new ramp from Abernethy Road to Tonkin Highway southbound was constructed as part of the $1 billion Gateway WA project. Construction of the ramp, and the Gateway WA project, officially began on 1 February 2013 with a groundbreaking ceremony attended by the state and federal transport ministers, Troy Buswell and Anthony Albanese, and was opened to the public in early 2014.

Major intersections

The major intersections along Abernethy Road are controlled by traffic lights.
  Great Eastern Highway (National Highway 94 / National Route 1)
  Fairbrother Street (State Route 55)
 Alexander Road
 Wright Street
 Fulham Street
  Leach Highway (State Route 7) (SPUI Interchange)
 Kewdale Road
 Daddow Road – to Roe Highway northeastbound
 Kalamunda Road
  Great Eastern Highway Bypass (National Highway 94)

See also

Notes

Roads in Perth, Western Australia
Forrestfield, Western Australia
Belmont, Western Australia